A PEST sequence is a peptide sequence that is rich in proline (P), glutamic acid (E), serine (S), and threonine (T). This sequence is associated with proteins that have a short intracellular half-life; therefore, it is hypothesized that the PEST sequence acts as a signal peptide for protein degradation.

This protein degradation may be mediated via the proteasome or calpain.

Other signals thought to identify proteins for degradation include cyclin destruction boxes, which are amino acid sequences that mark cell-cycle proteins for destruction.

References

Peptide sequences
Proteins
Post-translational modification